Smaragdinella is a genus of medium-sized sea snails or bubble snails, marine opisthobranch gastropod molluscs in the family Haminoeidae, the haminoea bubble snails, part of the clade Cephalaspidea, the headshield slugs and bubble snails.

Species
Species within the genus Smaragdinella include:
 Smaragdinella calyculata (Broderip & G. B. Sowerby I, 1829)
 Smaragdinella fragilis Bozzetti, 2008
 Smaragdinella kirsteueri Ev. Marcus & Er. Marcus, 1970
 Smaragdinella sieboldi A. Adams, 1864
Species brought into synonymy
 Smaragdinella algirae (A. Adams in G. B. Sowerby II, 1850): synonym of Melanochlamys algirae (A. Adams in G. B. Sowerby II, 1850)
 Smaragdinella andersoni (G. Nevill & H. Nevill, 1871): synonym of Smaragdinella sieboldi A. Adams, 1864
 Smaragdinella canaliculata (Broderip & G.B. Sowerby I, 1829): synonym of Smaragdinella calyculata (Broderip & G. B. Sowerby I, 1829)
 Smaragdinella thecaphora Carpenter, 1857: synonym of Julia thecaphora (Carpenter, 1857)
 Smaragdinella viridis (Rang in Quoy & Gaimard, 1832): synonym of Smaragdinella calyculata (Broderip & G. B. Sowerby I, 1829)

References

 Rudman, W. B. (1972). The herbivorous opisthobranch genera Phanerophthalmus A. Adams and Smaragdinella A. Adams. Proceedings of the Malacological Society of London. 40: 189-210

External links 
  Adams A. 1850.'' Monograph of the family Bullidae. In: G.B. Sowerby II (ed.), Thesaurus Conchyliorum, vol. 2: 553-608, pl. 119-125
 Adams, A. & Reeve, L. A. (1848-1850). Mollusca. In A. Adams (ed.), The zoology of the voyage of H.M.S. Samarang, under the command of Captain Sir Edward Belcher, C.B., F.R.A.S., F.G.S., during the years 1843-1846. Reeve & Benham, London, x + 87 pp., 24 pls.
 Gray, J. E. (1850). (text). In: Gray, M. E., Figures of molluscous animals, selected from various authors. Longman, Brown, Green and Longmans, London. Vol. 4, iv + 219 pp.
 Oskars T.R., Too C.C., Rees D., Mikkelsen P.M., Willassen E. & Malaquias M.A.E. (2019). A molecular phylogeny of the gastropod family Haminoeidae sensu lato (Heterobranchia: Cephalaspidea): a generic revision. Invertebrate Systematics. 33: 426-472.

Haminoeidae